Quintet is a Canadian music variety television series which aired on CBC Television in 1962.

Premise
Various music styles from folk, blues, pop, theatrical songs and world music were featured in this series. The show featured Eleanor Collins, Bud Spencer and the Chris Gage Trio.

Scheduling
This half-hour series was broadcast Fridays at 3:00 p.m. from 5 January to 29 June 1962.

References

External links
 

CBC Television original programming
1962 Canadian television series debuts
1962 Canadian television series endings